Elizabeth Whitaker  may refer to:

Elizabeth Whitaker (Wyandot)
Elizabeth Whitaker (author) and inventor
Elizabeth Whittaker, character in Poirot's Hallowe'en Party
Elizabeth Whittaker, architect and educator